Reidar Skau (26 December 1893 – 19 February 1975) was a Norwegian judge.

He was born in Christiania, a son of Aksel Olaf Skau and Anna Karoline Dahl. He graduated as cand.jur. in 1920, and later practiced as a barrister. He was appointed Justice of the Supreme Court of Norway from 1945 to 1963. He was decorated Commander of the Order of St. Olav in 1952. He died in 1975 and was buried at Haslum.

References 

1893 births
1975 deaths
Judges from Oslo
Supreme Court of Norway justices